Mubarak Shah (born Mubarak Khan) was the second monarch of the Sayyid dynasty which ruled the Delhi Sultanate.

Ancestry 
Sultan Mubarak Shah was the son of Khizr Khan a Punjabi Khokhar Chieftain from Multan.

Life 
He succeeded his father, Khizr Khan to the throne in 1421. Born Mubarak Khan, he took up the regnal name of Muizz-ud-Din Mubarak Shah or simply Mubarak Shah. The Sayyids were subservient to Timur's successor, Shah Rukh, and while Khizr Khan did not assume the title of sultan, Mubarak Shah was acknowledged as one and  However, it is also known that Mubarak Shah received a robe and a chatr (a ceremonial parasol) from the Timurid capital of Herat which indicates that the fealty continued in his time. During his reign, Mubarak Shah had to deal with the rise of local dynasties in the aftermath of the Timurid invasion of India. However, the biggest threat to his power that he faced was that of Jasrat Khokhar, a local Muslim chieftain from the Punjab who had conquered vast territories and eventually marched into Delhi in 1431 and conquered the Delhi Sultanate but later, a battle was fought in September 1432 in which Jasrat Khokhar was defeated and forced to leave Delhi and give up large amounts of his territory to the Delhi Sultan. Two years after this great victory however, Mubarak Shah was murdered in 1434 and succeeded by his nephew, Muhammad Shah.

See also
 Kotla Mubarakpur

Notes

References
 
 

Sayyid dynasty
1434 deaths
Indian people of Arab descent